Siaugues-Sainte-Marie is a commune in the Haute-Loire département in south-central France.

Population

Château de Saint Romain 

Siaugues is overlooked by the ruined towers of a castle established in the 13th century by Saint Louis IX to repel Angevin forces based to the west on the opposite side of the river Allier.

The castle changed hands several times, coming into the possession of the La Fayette family in c.1400 under Gilbert Motier de La Fayette. It remained in the family until the French Revolution when it was taken by the commune and used as a quarry. The castle then passed into private ownership and some preservation work has begun.

Personalities
Maurice Fombeure, poet

References

External links
 Commune website

Communes of Haute-Loire